Arthur Shepherd (February 19, 1880 – January 12, 1958) was an American composer and conductor in the 20th century.

Life and career
Shepherd was born in Paris, Idaho, into a Mormon family. His family loved to sing and his father, William N. B. Shepherd,
wrote the hymn “Give Us Room That We May Dwell.” Shepherd performed with both the Paris Brass Band and the Bear Lake Stake Choir.

Shepherd entered the New England Conservatory when he was only twelve years old. After graduating with honors and as president
of his class, Shepherd returned to his family who had moved to Salt Lake City, Utah, and led a local orchestra for six years.  In 1901, he married Hattie Hooper Jennings.

After some encouragement, he returned to the east and took a teaching position at the New England Conservatory where he studied under Charles F. Dennée, Percy Goetschius, Carl Faelten, and George W. Chadwick. He briefly served as a bandmaster during World War I. His marriage fell apart after his return from Europe and he moved with his children to Cleveland, Ohio. He took a job as the Assistant Director of the Cleveland Orchestra.

In 1922 he married Grazella Shepherd.

In 1927 he returned to teaching at the Western Reserve University in Cleveland. He retired in 1950 and died in 1958, after a failed operation at a Cleveland hospital. He composed over 100 works, including symphonies, string quartets and songs.

Shepherd was a Latter-day Saint. Although around the time of World War I, his divorce and remarriage, he distanced himself from the faith, he maintained a faith in God and his connections to the church and his people. His work made reference to the geography and music of the Latter-day Saints.

Awards

 1905 Paderewski Prize for Overture Joyeuse (orchestral work performed by the New York Symphony conducted by Walter Damrosch
 1909 First prize in the National Federal of Music Clubs for Sonata for the Pianoforte

Works

 1904 Capriccio (for piano)
 1904 Etude (for piano)
 1905 Overture Joyeuse
 1907 The Lord Hath Brought Again Zion (choral work with text from Doctrine and Covenants)
 1909 Five Songs on Poems by James Russell Lowell
 1909 Sonata for the Pianoforte
 1913  The City in the Sea (cantata)
 1927 Horizons (symphony)

Influences
His influences include Percy Goetschius and George W. Chadwick, Arthur Farwell, French Impressionists and Englishman, Vaughan Williams.

Selected works
 Ouverture Joyeuse
 Horizons
 Triptych
 Piano Quintet
 Matin Song
 He Came All So Still
 The Lost Child
 Nocturn
 Solitude
 Where Loveliness Keeps House
 Two-Step
 Exotic Dance No. 1
 From a Mountain lake
 Gigue Fantasque

References

External links

 Arthur Shepherd Biography at the University of Utah Marriott Library of Special Collections
 Arthur Shepherd Biography from Allmusic
 Encyclopedia of Cleveland article on Arthur Shepherd
 
 

1880 births
1958 deaths
20th-century classical composers
American classical composers
American Latter Day Saints
American male classical composers
Burials at Salt Lake City Cemetery
Case Western Reserve University faculty
Musicians from Idaho
New England Conservatory alumni
New England Conservatory faculty
People from Paris, Idaho
Pupils of Percy Goetschius
20th-century American composers
20th-century American male musicians